Nepal Financial Reporting Standards (NFRS) are designed as a common global language for business affairs so that company accounts are understandable and comparable within Nepal. The rules to be followed by accountants to maintain books of accounts which is comparable, understandable, reliable and relevant as per the users internal or external.

NFRS was issued by Nepal Accounting Standard Board in 2013. Earlier it has issued Nepal Accounting Standards. NFRS is prepared in line with on IFRS.

Objective of financial statements

Financial statements are a structured representation of the financial positions and financial performance of an entity. The objective of financial statements is to provide information about the financial position, financial performance and cash flows of an entity that is useful to a wide range of users in making economic decisions.

To meet this objective, financial statements provide information about an entity's:
     assets;
     liabilities;
     equity;
     income and expenses, including gains and losses;
     contributions by and distributions to owners in their capacity as owners;
     cash flows
This information, along with other information in the notes, assists users of financial statements to predict the entity's future cash flows and, in particular, their timing and certainty.

The following are the general features in NFRS:
 Fair presentation and compliance with NFRS:
Fair presentation requires the faithful representation of the effects of the transactions, other events and conditions in accordance with the definitions and recognition criteria for assets, liabilities, income and expenses set out in the Framework of NFRS.
 Going concern: 
Financial statements are present on a going concern basis unless management either intends to liquidate the entity or to cease trading, or has no realistic alternative but to do so.
 Accrual basis of accounting: 
An entity shall recognise items as assets, liabilities, equity, income and expenses when they satisfy the definition and recognition criteria for those elements in the Framework of NFRS.
 Materiality and aggregation: 
Every material class of similar items has to be presented separately. Items that are of a dissimilar nature or function shall be presented separately unless they are immaterial.
 Offsetting
Offsetting is generally forbidden in NFRS.
 Frequency of reporting: 
NFRS requires that at least annually a complete set of financial statements is presented.
 Comparative information: 
NFRS requires entities to present comparative information in respect of the preceding period for all amounts reported in the current period's financial statements. In addition comparative information shall also be provided for narrative and descriptive information if it is relevant to understanding the current period's financial statements.
 Consistency of presentation: 
NFRS requires that the presentation and classification of items in the financial statements is retained from one period to the next unless: 
(a)     it is apparent, following a significant change in the nature of the entity's operations or a review of its financial statements, that another presentation or classification would be more appropriate having regard to the criteria for the selection and application of accounting policies.
(b)     an NFRS standard requires a change in presentation.

https://en.ican.org.np/site/show/nfrs-2018

Applicability
The applicability depends upon the nature of entity. However NFRS-9, Financial Instrument shall be applicable with effect from 16 July 2015 onwards.

Type
	
Category A - from FY 2014-15
 Listed Multinational Manufacturing Companies
 Listed State Owned Enterprises (SOEs) with minimum paid up capital of Rs. 5 billions (except Banks and Financial Institutions under BAFIA  Act, 2006)
	
Category B - from FY 2015-16
 Commercial Banks, including State Owned Commercial Banks;
 All other Listed State Owned Enterprises (SOEs)

Category C - from FY 2016-17
 All other Financial Institutions not covered under A & B above
 All other SOEs
 Insurance Companies
 All other Listed Companies
 All other Corporate Bodies/Entities not defined as SMEs or entities having borrowing with minimum of Rs. 500 million.

Category D - from FY 2016-17
 SMEs as defined and classified by ASB

See also
 Institute of Chartered Accountants of Nepal
 Nepal Accounting Standard Board
 List of International Financial Reporting Standards
 Philosophy of Accounting
 International Public Sector Accounting Standards

External links
 http://www.ican.org.np/nfrs.php
 http://www.asbnepal.gov.np

Financial regulation
Standards of Nepal
Accounting principles by country